Arsen Gevorgyan (born June 1, 1975 in Yerevan, Armenian SSR) is an Armenian retired judoka who competed at the 1996 Summer Olympics. His cousin Armen Gevorgyan is a Belgian basketball player.

References

External links
Sports-Reference.com

1975 births
Living people
Sportspeople from Yerevan
Armenian male judoka
Olympic judoka of Armenia
Judoka at the 1996 Summer Olympics